The Canadian men's national basketball team represents Canada in international basketball competitions since 1923. They are overseen by Canada Basketball, the governing body of basketball in Canada. The team's head coach is Nick Nurse and its general manager is Rowan Barrett. 

In nine Olympic appearances, Canada has won one medal in basketball – a silver at the 1936 Games in Berlin. The team finished fourth in 1976 and 1984. Canada has won six medals at the FIBA AmeriCup – two silver medals in 1980 and 1999, as well as four bronze medals in 1984, 1988, 2001, and 2015. The team also won its first medal at the Pan American Games, a silver medal, in 2015.

The Canadian senior national team won its only gold medal at a university-level tournament, the 1983 Summer Universiade, which the country hosted in Edmonton, Alberta.

History 
As the country credited for bringing forth the inventor of the game, Canada's national team has often been a major competitor at the global stage. Yet, it still waits for its first title at a major international tournament.

Especially in the 1970s and 1980s, Team Canada was consistently placed among the top teams in the world. The emergence of Steve Nash gave another boost to the team in the 1990s. Yet, great performances became more scarce when he retired.

In September 2009, Canada finished fourth in the 2009 FIBA Americas Championship. This guaranteed them a place in the 2010 FIBA World Championship held in Turkey. Canada unfortunately finished last (6th) of the Group D, and got ranked 22nd of the FIBA World Cup.

Critics blamed the absence of Nash, Dalembert, Jamaal Magloire and Matt Bonner for Canada's disappointing performance at the 2010 FIBA World Championship.  Ambitions to gather Canada's most outstanding basketball players for the 2010 squad failed as Nash retired from the national team in 2007,

Bonner did not get his citizenship in time, Dalembert was cut from the team after issues with former head coach Rautins and Magloire simply opted not to play.

On May 9, 2012, Steve Nash was named general manager of the national team of Canada.

The Canadians made their debut at the 2018 Commonwealth Games on the Gold Coast, winning a silver medal.

With the approaching 2019 FIBA World Cup, Rowan Barrett hired Toronto Raptors head coach Nick Nurse to coach Team Canada through the World Cup and possibly the 2020 Tokyo Summer Olympics.

The team withdrew from its FIBA AmeriCup qualifying games against Cuba on 29 November 2020 and against the US Virgin Islands on 30 November 2020, on the advice of medical experts due to risks posed by the ongoing COVID-19 pandemic.  As a consequence on 20 January 2021 the International Basketball Federation docked the team a point in the standings in addition to a 160,000 Swiss francs fine levied against Canada Basketball.

Team

Current roster 
Roster for the 2022 FIBA AmeriCup.

Head coaches

Past rosters 
Scroll down to see more.
1936 Summer Olympics: finished 2nd of 21 teams

Gordon Aitchison, Ian Allison, Arthur Chapman, Charles Chapman, Edward Dawson, Irving Meretsky, Douglas Peden, James Stewart, Malcolm Wiseman were awarded silver medals for having played in at least one match during the tournament. Reserves John Dawson, Alphonse Freer, Donald Grey, Stanley Nantais, Robert Osborne, Thomas Pendlebury, and coach Gordon Fuller were not awarded medals.

1948 Summer Olympics: finished 9th of 23 teams

Ole Bakken, Bill Bell, David Bloomfield, Dave Campbell, Harry Kermode, Bennie Lands, Pat McGeer, Reid Mitchell, Mort Morein, Nev Munro, Bob Scarr, Cy Strulovitch, Sol Tolchinsky, Murray Waxman. (Coach: Bob Osborne)

1952 Summer Olympics: finished 9th of 23 teams

Ralph Campbell, William Coulthard, James Curren, Charles Dalton, William Pataky, Glenn Pettinger, Robert Phibbs, Bernard Pickel, Carl Ridd, Robert Simpson, Harry Wade, George Wearring, Roy Williams. (Player/Coach: Paul Thomas)

1954 FIBA World Championship: finished 7th of 12 teams

Roy Burkett, Ken Callis, George Delkers, Doug Gresham, Herb Olafson, Wally Parobec, Carl Ridd, Andy Spack, Mike Spack, Ralph Watts. (Coach: Jim Bullock)

1956 Summer Olympics: finished 9th of 15 teams

Ronald Bissett, Doug Brinham, Mel Brown, Bob Burtwell, Edward Lucht, Donald MacIntosh, John McLeod, Coulter Osborne, Bernard Pickel, Ron Stuart, George Stulac, Ed Wild. (Coach: L. Hudson)

1959 FIBA World Championship: finished 12th of 13 teams

Doug Brinham, Al Brown, Bob Burtwell, Ed Lucht, Ed Malecki, John McLeod, Peter Mullins, Lance Stephens, Logan Tait, Brian Upson, Ed Wild. (Coach: Fred Collen)

1963 FIBA World Championship: finished 11th of 13 teams

Harry Blacker, Neil Dirom, Gordon Fester, Ken Galanchuk, Bob Inglis, Ken Larsen, Jack Lilja, Bill McDonald, Lance Stephens, Logan Tait, Dave Way, Al West. (Coach: Bob Hamilton)

1964 Summer Olympics: finished 14th of 16 teams

Walter Birtles, John Dacyshyn, Rolly Goldring, Keith Hartley, Barry Howson, Fred Ingaldson, James Maguire, John McKibbon, Warren Reynolds, Ruby Richman, George Stulac, Joe Stulac. (Coach: Ruby Richman)

1970 FIBA World Championship: finished 10th of 13 teams

John Barton, Alex Braiden, John Cassidy, Rod Cox, Bruce Dempster, Barry Howson, Terry MacKay, Bob Molinski, Dave Murphy, Bill Robinson, Derek Sankey, Ron Thorsen.  (Coach: Paul Mullins)

1972 Pre-Olympic Basketball Tournament: finished 6th of 12 teams

John Cassidy, Tom Kieswetter, Terry McKay, Jamie Russell, Derek Sankey, Gary Smith, Ron Thorsen, Phil Tollestrup, Tim Tollestrup, Bob Town, Ted Stoesz, Ross Wedlake. (Coach: Jack Donohue)

1974 FIBA World Championship: finished 8th of 14 teams

Alex Devlin, Lars Hansen, Ken McKenzie, Michael Moser, Romel Raffin, George Rautins, Martin Riley, Jamie Russell, Bob Sharpe, Robert Stewart, Phil Tollestrup. (Coach: Jack Donohue)

1976 Summer Olympics: finished 4th of 12 teams

John Cassidy, Alex Devlin, Cameron Hall, Lars Hansen, Romel Raffin, Martin Riley, Bill Robinson, Jamie Russell, Derek Sankey, Bob Sharpe, Phil Tollestrup, Bob Town. (Coach: Jack Donohue)

1978 FIBA World Championship: finished 6th of 14 teams

Steve Atkin, Tom Bishop, John Cassidy, Tom Kappos, Howard Kelsey, Ross Quakenbush, Leo Rautins, Martin Riley, Jamie Russell, Peter Ryan, Jay Triano, Jim Zoet. (Coach: Jack Donohue)

1980 Tournament of the Americas: finished 2nd of 7 teams

Tom Bishop, Reni Dolcetti, Varouj Gurunlian, Howard Kelsey, Perry Mirkovich, Ross Quackenbush, Romel Raffin, Leo Rautins, Martin Riley, Doc Ryan, Jay Triano, Jim Zoet. (Coach: Jack Donohue)

1982 FIBA World Championship: finished 6th of 12 teams

Ron Crevier, Stewart Granger, Gerald Kazanowski, Howard Kelsey, Ken Larson, Dan Meagher, Eli Pasquale, Leo Rautins, Tony Simms, Jay Triano, Bill Wennington, Greg Wiltjer. (Coach: Jack Donohue)

1983 Summer Universiade: finished 1st of 16 teams

Kelly Dukeshire,  John Hatch, Gord Herbert, Gerald Kazanowski, Howard Kelsey, Dan Meagher, Eli Pasquale, Tony Simms, Karl Tilleman, Jay Triano, Bill Wennington, Greg Wiltjer. (Coach: Jack Donohue)

1984 Tournament of the Americas: finished 3rd of 9 teams

John Hatch, Gord Herbert, Gerald Kazanowski, Howard Kelsey, Dan Meagher, Eli Pasquale, Romel Raffin, Tony Simms, Karl Tilleman, Jay Triano, Bill Wennington, Greg Wiltjer. (Coach: Jack Donohue)

1984 Summer Olympics: finished 4th of 12 teams

John Hatch, Gord Herbert, Gerald Kazanowski, Howard Kelsey, Dan Meagher, Eli Pasquale, Romel Raffin, Tony Simms, Karl Tilleman, Jay Triano, Bill Wennington, Greg Wiltjer. (Coach: Jack Donohue)

1986 FIBA World Championship: finished 8th of 24 teams

Gerry Besselink, John Hatch, Gord Herbert, Gerald Kazanowski, Howard Kelsey, Barry Mungar, Dan Meagher, Eli Pasquale, Tony Simms, Jay Triano, David Turcotte, Greg Wiltjer. (Coach: Jack Donohue)

1988 Tournament of the Americas: finished 3rd of 7 teams

Barry Bekkedam, Norm Clarke, John Hatch, Alan Kristmanson, Barry Mungar, Eli Pasquale, Romel Raffin, Karl Tilleman, Jay Triano, David Turcotte, Wayne Yearwood, Dwight Walton. (Coach: Jack Donohue)

1988 Summer Olympics: finished 6th of 12 teams

Norm Clarke, John Hatch, Gerald Kazanowski, Alan Kristmanson, Barry Mungar, Eli Pasquale, Romel Raffin, Karl Tilleman, Jay Triano, David Turcotte, Wayne Yearwood, Dwight Walton. (Coach: Jack Donohue)

1989 Tournament of the Americas: finished 5th of 10 teams

Cord Clemons, Stewart Granger, John Karpis, Gerald Kazanowski, Alan Kristmanson, Spencer McKay, Phil Ohl, Eli Pasquale, Rob Samuels, Tony Simms, Leo Rautins, David Turcotte. (Coach: Ken Shields)

1990 FIBA World Championship: finished 11th of 16 teams

Rick Fox, Stewart Granger, J.D. Jackson, Gerald Kazanowski, Martin Keane, Dan Meagher, Phil Ohl, Eli Pasquale, Tony Simms, Andrew Steinfeld, Dwight Walton, Jim Zoet. (Coach: Ken Shields)

1992 Tournament of the Americas: finished 5th of 10 teams

J.D. Jackson, Martin Keane, Gerald Kazanowski, Al Kristmanson, Ronn McMahon, Phil Ohl,  Leo Rautins, Mike Smrek, Jay Triano, David Turcotte, Bill Wennington, Trevor Williams, Greg Wiltjer. (Coach: Ken Shields)

1993 Tournament of the Americas: finished 7th of 10 teams

Rowan Barrett, Jeff Foreman, Kory Hallas, Cordell Llewellyn, Ronn McMahon, Steve Nash, William Njoku, David Turcotte, Sean Van Koughnett, Joey Vickery, Dwight Walton, Rob Wilson (Coach: Ken Shields)

1994 FIBA World Championship: finished 7th of 16 teams

Rick Fox, Kory Hallas, J.D. Jackson, Martin Keane, Spencer McKay, Ronn McMahon, Steve Nash, William Njoku, Mike Smrek, Joey Vickery, Dwight Walton, Greg Wiltjer. (Coach: Ken Shields)

1995 Tournament of the Americas: finished 4th of 10 teams

Bobby Allen, Phil Dixon, Kory Hallas, Sherman Hamilton, Martin Keane, Michael Meeks, Steve Nash, William Njoku, Joey Vickery, Dwight Walton, Greg Wiltjer, Wayne Yearwood. (Coach: Steve Konchalski)

1997 Tournament of the Americas: finished 5th of 10 teams

Rowan Barrett, Pascal Fleury, Sherman Hamilton, Martin Keane, Michael Meeks, Steve Nash, William Njoku, Eli Pasquale, Peter Van Elswyk, Joey Vickery, Rob Wilson, Wayne Yearwood. (Coach: Steve Konchalski)

1998 FIBA World Championship: finished 12th of 16 teams

Rowan Barrett, David Daniels, Greg Francis, Peter Guarasci, Kory Hallas, Sherman Hamilton, Martin Keane, Todd MacCulloch, Michael Meeks, Greg Newton, William Njoku, Joey Vickery. (Coach: Steve Konchalski)

1999 Tournament of the Americas: finished 2nd of 10 teams

Richard Elias Anderson, Rowan Barrett, Peter Guarasci, Sherman Hamilton, Andrew Mavis, Todd MacCulloch, Jordie McTavish, Michael Meeks, Steve Nash (Tournament MVP), Greg Newton, Shawn Swords, Keith Vassell (Coach: Jay Triano)

2000 Summer Olympics: finished 7th of 12 teams

Rowan Barrett, David Daniels, Greg Francis, Peter Guarasci, Sherman Hamilton, Eric Hinrichsen, Todd MacCulloch, Andrew Mavis, Michael Meeks, Steve Nash, Greg Newton, Shawn Swords. (Coach: Jay Triano)

2001 Tournament of the Americas: finished 3rd of 10 teams

David Daniels, Peter Guarasci, Sherman Hamilton, Kevin Jobity, Prosper Karangwa, Andrew Kwiatkowski, Todd MacCulloch, Michael Meeks, Steve Nash, Jerome Robinson, Shawn Swords, Dean Walker. (Coach: Jay Triano)

2002 FIBA World Championship: finished 13th of 16 teams

Richard Elias Anderson, Rowan Barrett, Titus Channer, Sherman Hamilton, Kevin Jobity, Prosper Karangwa, Michael Meeks, Greg Meldrum, Steve Ross, Shawn Swords, Dave Thomas, Novell Thomas. (Coach: Jay Triano)

2003 Tournament of the Americas: finished 4th of 10 teams

Rowan Barrett, Denham Brown, Greg Francis, Peter Guarasci, Prosper Karangwa, Mike King, Andrew Kwiatkowski, Steve Nash (Tournament MVP), Greg Newton, Novell Thomas, Jesse Young. (Coach: Jay Triano)

2005 FIBA Americas Championship: finished 9th of 10 teams

Jermaine Anderson, Richard Elias Anderson, Denham Brown, Jermaine Bucknor, Nathan Doornekamp, Carl English, James Gillingham, Kevin Jobity, Levon Kendall, Vidal Massiah, Juan Mendez, Randall Nohr. (Coach: Leo Rautins)

2007 FIBA Americas Championship: finished 5th of 10 teams

Jermaine Anderson, Ryan Bell, Denham Brown, Samuel Dalembert, Carl English, Olu Famutimi, Levon Kendall, Vladimir Kuljanin, Juan Mendez, Andy Rautins, David Thomas, Jesse Young. (Coach: Leo Rautins)

2008 FIBA World Olympic Qualifying Tournament for Men: finished 5th of 8 teams

Jermaine Anderson, Joel Anthony, Rowan Barrett, Ransford Brempong, Samuel Dalembert, Aaron Doornekamp, Carl English, Olu Famutimi, Levon Kendall, Tyler Kepkay, Andy Rautins, David Thomas. (Coach: Leo Rautins)

2009 FIBA Americas Championship: finished 4th of 10 teams

Jermaine Anderson, Joel Anthony, Ryan Bell, Jermaine Bucknor, Aaron Doornekamp, Carl English, Olu Famutimi, Levon Kendall, Tyler Kepkay, Kyle Landry, Andy Rautins, Jesse Young. (Coach: Leo Rautins)

2010 FIBA World Championship: finished 22nd of 24 teams

Jermaine Anderson, Joel Anthony, Ryan Bell, Denham Brown, Jermaine Bucknor, Aaron Doornekamp, Olu Famutimi, Levon Kendall, Kelly Olynyk, Andy Rautins, Robert Sacre, Jevohn Shepherd. (Coach: Leo Rautins)

2011 FIBA Americas Championship: finished 6th of 10 teams

Jermaine Anderson, Joel Anthony, Denham Brown, Aaron Doornekamp, Carl English, Jeff Ferguson, Cory Joseph, Levon Kendall, Kelly Olynyk, Andy Rautins, Jevohn Shepherd, Jesse Young. (Coach: Leo Rautins)

2013 FIBA Americas Championship: finished 6th of 10 teams

Jermaine Anderson, Joel Anthony, Junior Cadougan, Aaron Doornekamp, Brady Heslip, Cory Joseph, Devoe Joseph, Levon Kendall, Andrew Nicholson, Andy Rautins, Jevohn Shepherd, Tristan Thompson. (Coach: Jay Triano)

2015 Pan American Games: finished 2nd of 8 teams

Anthony Bennett, Sim Bhullar, Dillon Brooks, Junior Cadougan, Aaron Doornekamp, Melvin Ejim, Carl English, Brady Heslip, Daniel Mullings, Jamal Murray, Andrew Nicholson, Kyle Wiltjer. (Coach: Jay Triano)

2015 FIBA Americas Championship: finished 3rd of 10 teams

Anthony Bennett, Aaron Doornekamp, Melvin Ejim, Brady Heslip, Cory Joseph, Andrew Nicholson, Kelly Olynyk, Dwight Powell, Robert Sacre, Philip Scrubb, Nik Stauskas, Andrew Wiggins. (Coach: Jay Triano)

2016 FIBA World Olympic Qualifying Tournament – Manila: finished 2nd of 6 teams

Joel Anthony, Anthony Bennett, Khem Birch, Melvin Ejim, Tyler Ennis, Shai Gilgeous-Alexander, Brady Heslip, Cory Joseph, Levon Kendall, Philip Scrubb, Thomas Scrubb, Tristan Thompson. (Coach: Jay Triano)

2017 FIBA AmeriCup: finished 8th of 12 teams

Richard Amardi, Jermaine Anderson, Joel Anthony, Murphy Burnatowski, Junior Cadougan, Ammanuel Diressa, Grandy Glaze, Olivier Hanlan, Brady Heslip, Andrew Nicholson, Dyshawn Pierre, Xavier Rathan-Mayes. (Coach: Roy Rana)

2019 FIBA Basketball World Cup: finished 21st of 32 teams

Khem Birch, Melvin Ejim, Brady Heslip, Cory Joseph, Kaza Kajami-Keane,
Owen Klassen, Conor Morgan, Andrew Nembhard, Kevin Pangos, Phil Scrubb,
Thomas Scrubb, Kyle Wiltjer. (Coach: Nick Nurse)

2020 FIBA Men's Olympic Qualifying Tournaments – Victoria: finished 3rd of 6 teams

Nickeil Alexander-Walker, RJ Barrett, Trae Bell-Haynes, Anthony Bennett, Aaron Doornekamp, Luguentz Dort, Cory Joseph, Trey Lyles, Mychal Mulder, Andrew Nicholson, Dwight Powell, Andrew Wiggins. (Coach: Nick Nurse)

Competitive record

Summer Olympics

FIBA World Cup

FIBA AmeriCup

Pan American Games

Commonwealth Games 
2018: Silver

FIBA Diamond Ball 
2000: 4th place

Marchand Continental Championship Cup 
2007: 3rd place
2009: 3rd place
2011: 4th place
2013: 5th place
2015: Champions

Summer Universiade 

1983: Gold 
1985: Bronze 
1991: Silver 
1993: Silver 
1995: Bronze 
1997: Silver 
2003: Bronze 
2007: Bronze 
2011: Silver

See also 

Canada Basketball
FIBA Americas
Canada women's national basketball team
Canada national under-19 basketball team
Canada national under-17 basketball team

References

External links 

FIBA Profile
USBasket.com – Canada Men National Team
Archived records of Canada team participations

 
 
Men's national basketball teams
1936 establishments in Canada